Kelly Crean (born September 9, 1974) is an American actress.

Filmography
Opposite Day (2008) - Cindy
Bratz: The Movie (2007) - Mrs. Funk
The Wedding Bells (2007) - Crystal (1 episode)
Smith (2006) - Denise (1 episode)
Twenty Good Years (2006) - Maid / Marley (2 episodes)
Sex, Love & Secrets (2005) - Karla Drake (1 episode)
McBride: Murder Past Midnight (2005) - Karen
The Heartbreak Cafe (2004) - Loretta Grey (3 episodes)
Port Charles (2003) - Harriet Cameron (3 episodes)
The Stan Freberg Commercials (1999) (segment "In the Park")
At Home on the Range (1992) - Herself (1993)

External links

1974 births
Living people
People from San Clemente, California
American film actresses
American television actresses
Actresses from California
21st-century American actresses